Piet Bekaert (8 May 1939, in Vichte – 7 July 2000, in Deurle) was a Belgian painter. Influenced by the Impressionists, he is known for his characteristic subdued lighting style and garden and indoor scenes.

References

1939 births
2000 deaths
People from Anzegem
20th-century Belgian painters